Bonez Tour 2005: Live at Budokan is a DVD from Avril Lavigne's second tour, Bonez Tour, released in 2005. It was only released in Japan. The DVD comes with an insert with lyrics of the songs in Japanese and English, along with some behind-the-scenes information.

Track listing
"He Wasn't"
"My Happy Ending"
"Take Me Away"
"Freak Out"
"Unwanted"
"Anything But Ordinary"
"Who Knows"
"I'm with You"
"Losing Grip"
"Together"
"Forgotten"
"Tomorrow"
"Nobody's Home"
"Fall to Pieces"
"Don't Tell Me"
"Sk8er Boi"
"Complicated"
"Slipped Away"
"Behind the Scenes" (1:57)

Credits
Filmed at Nippon Budokan on March 10, 2005
Filmed by FIP
Produced and directed by Toru Uehara
Edited by Joe Ueno for IMAGICA
All photos by Tony Mott
DVD package design by Jam-0/John Rummen @ Artwerks Design
Mixed by Tom Lord-Alge
Mixed at South Beach Studios
Assisted by Femio Hernandez
Behind the Scene bonus footage: 
Directed by Ryuzo Hirata, Ryoichiro Obata
Edited by Yoshinori Saburi for IMAGICA
Avril Lavigne: Lead vocals, rhythm guitar, piano 
Devin Bronson: Lead guitar, backing vocals
Craig Wood: Rhythm guitar, backing vocals 
Charles Moniz: Bass 
Matt Brann: Drums

Certifications

Release history

Awards

References

2005 video albums
Avril Lavigne video albums
Live video albums
Albums recorded at the Nippon Budokan